The 1972–73 Scottish Division One was won by Celtic, one point ahead of their nearest rival Rangers. Kilmarnock and Airdrieonians finished 17th and 18th respectively and were relegated to the 1973–74 Second Division.

League table

Results

See also
Nine in a row

References

League Tables

1972–73 Scottish Football League
Scottish Division One seasons
Scot